Young Galaxy is the 2007 debut album by the band Young Galaxy. It features a shoegazer sound similar to that of Luna or early Slowdive.

Track listing
All songs were written by Stephen Ramsay and Catherine McCandless, except as noted.
 "Swing Your Heartache"
 "No Matter How Hard You Try" (Ramsay)
 "Outside The City"
 "Lazy Religion"
 "Wailing Wall" (Ramsay)
 "The Sun's Coming Up And My Plane's Going Down" (Ramsay)
 "Searchlight" (Ramsay)
 "Lost In The Call"
 "Come and See"
 "Embers"
 "The Alchemy Between Us" (Ramsay)

References 

2007 debut albums
Young Galaxy albums
Arts & Crafts Productions albums